The Virgin of Mercy is a painting of the Virgin of Mercy type, produced around 1452 for the Cadard family by Enguerrand Quarton and Pierre Vilatte. It is now in the Musée Condé in Chantilly.

History and Description 
It was commissioned on 16 February 1452 by the procureurs of the Augustinian monastery for Pierre Cadard, in honour of his father, the doctor Jean Cadard (1377-1449). Jean had been counsellor to Charles VII of France, and went into exile in the Comtat Venaissin after being accused of having John the Fearless assassinated in 1419. It was intended as the altarpiece for the chapel of Saint Pierre of Luxembourg, which Jean Cadard had had built for the Église des Célestins in Avignon. 

The contract for the painting included a predella but did not specify its subject. It is now lost, but according to tradition it showed Christ surrounded by the Twelve Apostles. An upper panel is also now lost.

The next record of the work dates to 1823, when it was in the family collection of Jean-Baptiste Rousseau, French consul to Baghdad. It was then bought by the Louvre curator Frédéric Reiset, at which time it was described as a late 15th century Flemish primitive work. Along with the rest of Reiset's collection, it was bought by Henri d'Orleans, Duke of Aumale in 1879 and placed in the cabinet de Giotto in his Château de Chantilly. Archival studies in 1904 by Henri Bouchot and Paul Durrieu allowed the work to be definitively attributed to Enguerrand Quarton.

1450s paintings
Paintings in the collection of the Musée Condé
Paintings of the Virgin Mary
Paintings depicting John the Baptist
Paintings depicting John the Apostle